Cristian Castro Devenish (born 25 January 2001) is a Colombian professional footballer who plays as a defender for Atlético Nacional.

Playing career
Devenish began playing football at the age of 10 with his local club Deportivo Galapa, and then had stints at the academies of América de Cali and Atlético Nacional. After signing with Atlético Nacional, Devenish had a loan in Portugal with Vizela for the 2019–20 season, and on 28 August 2020 signed another loan with Boavista. Devenish made his professional debut with Boavista in a 1-0 Primeira Liga loss to Vitória S.C. on 19 October 2020.

References

External links
 
 
 

2001 births
Living people
Footballers from Barranquilla
Colombian footballers
Association football defenders
Atlético Nacional footballers
F.C. Vizela players
Boavista F.C. players
Primeira Liga players
Campeonato de Portugal (league) players
Categoría Primera A players
Colombian expatriate footballers
Colombian expatriates in Portugal
Expatriate footballers in Portugal